Shillingstone Quarry SSSI, Dorset is an 8.13 hectare geological Site of Special Scientific Interest in Dorset, England, notified in 1995.

References

Sources
 English Nature citation sheet for the site (accessed 31 August 2006)

External links
 English Nature website (SSSI information)

Sites of Special Scientific Interest in Dorset
Sites of Special Scientific Interest notified in 1995
Geology of Dorset
Quarries in Dorset